ISO 3166-2:CS was the entry for Serbia and Montenegro in ISO 3166-2, part of the ISO 3166 standard published by the International Organization for Standardization (ISO), which defines codes for the names of the principal subdivisions (e.g., provinces or states) of all countries coded in ISO 3166-1.

Serbia and Montenegro was officially assigned the ISO 3166-1 alpha-2 code  before it was dissolved in 2006, and the entry was deleted from ISO 3166-2 as a result. The two republics, Montenegro and Serbia, became independent and are now officially assigned the ISO 3166-1 alpha-2 codes  and  respectively.

Before 2003, the name of the country was Yugoslavia, and it was officially assigned the ISO 3166-1 alpha-2 code .

Note that while the ISO 3166-1 alpha-2 code  was used to represent Czechoslovakia before it was dissolved in 1993, this predated the first publication of ISO 3166–2 in 1998.

Changes
The following changes to the entry had been announced in newsletters by the ISO 3166/MA since the first publication of ISO 3166–2 in 1998:

Codes deleted in Newsletter I-8

See also
 Country codes of Serbia
 ISO 3166-2:ME (current code for Montenegro) 
 ISO 3166-2:RS (current code for Serbia)

External links
 ISO Online Browsing Platform: CS
 Serbia and Montenegro, Statoids.com

2:CS
Serbia and Montenegro